Coniocybe is a genus of fungi belonging to the family Coniocybaceae.

The species of this genus are found in Europe, America and Australia.

Species

Species:

Coniocybe atriocephala 
Coniocybe crocata 
Coniocybe farinosa

References

Ascomycota
Ascomycota genera